Pakistan Olympic Association (POA) or National Olympic Committee of Pakistan (NOC) (acronym: POA) is the national olympic organization in Pakistan. It was established in 1948 to oversee the active participation of the newly independent state at the Olympiad. Muhammad Ali Jinnah, the country's founder and first Governor-General, became the patron-in-chief of the new institution, and Ahmed E.H. Jaffar became its first President. 

Over the years, the association has been responsible for fundraising and setting up the management of delegations for the Olympic Games. As an NOC, the association is the first contact point for the International Olympic Committee. Some of its members are also active participants in various management activities at the IOC. Within the country, the association remains the oldest sports body. It was the premier regulator of sports activities in Pakistan from 1948 until the establishment of Pakistan Sports Board in 1962. 

The Association continues to develop programmes in co-ordination with its affiliated bodies to promote sports at various levels. It is also responsible for Pakistan's representation at the Commonwealth Games and organising the annual National Games.

Recognition 
After the independence of the country from the British Raj on 14 August 1947, the need was immediately realised to promote the culture of sports within the country and ensure wider participation and recognition at international level. In this respect, POA was affiliated by the International Olympic Committee in 1948. Subsequently, it also became a member of the Association of National Olympic Committees (ANOC) and the Olympic Council of Asia (OCA).

POA Presidents

POA Executive Committee

Affiliated associations 
The association controls its memberships through the working of its Affiliation and Constitution Committee, which is composed of the provincial sports bodies and POA officials. The following are the major sports federations and associations affiliated with the POA:

Provincial Olympic Associations 
 Balochistan Olympic Association
 Khyber Pakhtunkhwa Olympic Association
 Punjab Olympic Association
 Sindh Olympic Association
 Kashmir Olympic Association

Services organisations 

 Pakistan Army
 Pakistan Navy
 Pakistan Air Force
 Pakistan Railways
 Pakistan Police
 Water & Power Development Authority (WAPDA)
 Higher Education Commission (HEC)

National sports federations

IOC permanent Olympic sports

IOC Winter Olympic sports

IOC recognized sports

Others 
The following are the federations of sports not considered by the IOC as a 'sport':

See also 
Sport in Pakistan
Pakistan at the Olympics
Pakistan at the Commonwealth Games

References

External links 
 Official website

Pakistan
Pakistan
Non-profit organisations based in Pakistan
Sports organizations established in 1948
Oly
 
1948 establishments in Pakistan